The name Round Lake refers to over 36 different lakes in the state of Minnesota:
 Round Lake, located in Aitkin County, Minnesota
 Round Lake, located in Aitkin County, Minnesota
 Round Lake, located in Aitkin County, Minnesota
 Round Lake, located in Aitkin County, Minnesota
 Round Lake, located in Aitkin County, Minnesota
 Round Lake, located in Anoka County, Minnesota
 Round Lake, located in Becker County, Minnesota
 Round Lake, located in Becker County, Minnesota
 Round Lake, located in Chisago County, Minnesota
 Round Lake, located in Cook County, Minnesota
 Round Lake, located in Cottonwood County, Minnesota
 Round Lake, located in Crow Wing County, Minnesota
 Round Lake, located in Crow Wing County, Minnesota
 Round Lake, located in Douglas County, Minnesota
 Round Lake, located in Hennepin County, Minnesota
 Round Lake, located in Hennepin County, Minnesota
 Round Lake, located in Hubbard County, Minnesota
 Round Lake, located in Itasca County, Minnesota
 Round Lake, located in Itasca County, Minnesota
 Round Lake, located in Itasca County, Minnesota
 Round Lake, located in Itasca County, Minnesota
 Round Lake, located in Jackson County, Minnesota
 Round Lake, located in Le Sueur County, Minnesota
 Round Lake, located in Meeker County, Minnesota
 Round Lake, located in Morrison County, Minnesota
 Round Lake, located in Morrison County, Minnesota
 Round Lake, located in Morrison County, Minnesota
 Round Lake, located in Otter Tail County, Minnesota
 Round Lake, located in Otter Tail County, Minnesota
 Round Lake, located in Otter Tail County, Minnesota
 Round Lake, located in Otter Tail County, Minnesota
 Round Lake, located in Ramsey County, Minnesota
 Round Lake, located in Ramsey County, Minnesota
 Round Lake, located in Ramsey County, Minnesota
 Round Lake, located in Renville County, Minnesota
 Round Lake, located in Sherburne County, Minnesota
 Round Lake, located in St. Louis County, Minnesota
 Round Lake, located in Wadena County, Minnesota
 Round Lake, located in Washington County, Minnesota
 Round Lake, located in Wright County, Minnesota

Round Lake may be an alternate name for a lake in Minnesota:
 Little Round Lake, located in Becker County, Minnesota
 Sylvia Lake, located in Beltrami County, Minnesota
 Moses Lake, located in Cook County, Minnesota
 Gneiss Lake, located in Cook County, Minnesota
 Dolney Lake, located in Crow Wing County, Minnesota
 Orchard Lake, located in Dakota County, Minnesota
 Clausens Lake, located in Hubbard County, Minnesota
 Duck Lake, located in Hubbard County, Minnesota
 Culp Lake, located in Itasca County, Minnesota
 Doyle Lake, located in Lake County, Minnesota
 Rota Lake, located in Lake County, Minnesota
 Circle Lake, located in Lake County, Minnesota
 Maine Lake, located in Otter Tail County, Minnesota

Lakes of Minnesota